Little Turkey (1758–1801) was First Beloved Man of the Cherokee people, becoming, in 1794, the first Principal Chief of the original Cherokee Nation.

Headman
Little Turkey, born in 1758, was elected First Beloved Man by the general council of the Cherokee upon the re-establishment of the council's seat at Ustanali on the Conasauga River. This was following the murder of Corntassel in 1788.

The United States acknowledged his rival, Hanging Maw of Coyatee, as the Cherokees' leading headman, but the larger part of the Cherokee themselves, including the Chickamauga Cherokee (or Lower Cherokee) who followed Dragging Canoe, recognized Little Turkey as leader.

Following the end of the Cherokee–American wars (1794) and the subsequent organization that year of a national government, his title became Principal Chief of the Cherokee Nation—a title he held until his death in 1801.

References
Litton, Gaston L. "The Principal Chiefs of the Cherokee Nation", Chronicles of Oklahoma 15:3 (September 1937) 253-270; retrieved August 18, 2006.

1758 births
1801 deaths
Principal Chiefs of the Cherokee Nation (1794–1907)
18th-century Native Americans